Segolates are words in the Hebrew language whose end is of the form CVCVC, where the penultimate vowel receives syllable stress.  Such words are called "segolates" because the final unstressed vowel is typically (but not always) segol. These words evolved from older Semitic words that ended in a complex coda; indeed, when a suffix (other than an absolute plural) is added to a segolate, the original form (or something similar) reappears (cf. kéleḇ "dog" vs. kalbī "my dog").

Examples:
 

The ancient forms like *CawC (such as šawr "bull") almost universally evolved to non-segolate CôC ( šôr), though there are exceptions, such as  mā́weṯ "death".

Some segolate words' final syllable ends with a patach rather than a segol, due to the influence of guttural consonants in the final syllable.

Classical Arabic still preserves forms similar to the reconstructed Ancient Hebrew forms, e.g. ʼarḍ "earth", kalb "dog", ʻayn "eye", ṣidq "sincerity". (Some modern dialects insert an epenthetic vowel between the final two consonants, similar to what happened in Hebrew.)

Hebrew language